Evin may be one of several unrelated given names:
anglicized form of Irish Éimhín, for Saint Evin (6th century). The name is a diminutive of the adjective eimh "swift, active".
a variant of Evan, the Welsh form of John.
Kurdish ئەڤین (Evîn) means love, and given as girl first name
Syriac ܐܝܒ̣ܢ
a feminine Turkish name

The name is relatively rare. It is not one of the top 1,000 male names for babies in the U.S. in any year from 2000-2014.

Given name
Irish/Welsh
Evin Crowley (born 1945), British actress
Evin Lewis (born 1991), Trinidad and Tobago cricket player

Syriac/Kurdish
Evin Agassi, Iranian singer
Evin Rubar (born 1975), Sweden-born journalist of Kurdish origin

Turkish
Evin Demirhan (born 1995), Turkish female sport wrestler

Surname
French
Claude Évin (born 1949), French politician
Mike Evin (born 1979), Canadian singer-songwriter

Turkish
Devrim Evin (born 1978), Turkish actor

Canadian
Tasha-Ray Evin (born 1985) and Lacey-Lee Brass (née Evin) (born 1983), one half of the Canadian rock band Lillix

See also
Evin (disambiguation)
Evan

References